South Coast was an electoral district of the Legislative Assembly in the Australian state of Queensland from 1960 to 1992.

The district was based in the south-east corner of the state and included much of the Gold Coast.

Members for South Coast

Election results

See also
 Electoral districts of Queensland
 Members of the Queensland Legislative Assembly by year
 :Category:Members of the Queensland Legislative Assembly by name

References

Former electoral districts of Queensland
1960 establishments in Australia
1992 disestablishments in Australia
Constituencies established in 1960
Constituencies disestablished in 1992